Witnek Pass, (English: White Neck), is situated in the Eastern Cape, province of South Africa, on the road between Nieu-Bethesda and Cradock, Eastern Cape.

Mountain passes of the Eastern Cape